The Subcommittee on Government Operations is a subcommittee within the United States House Committee on Oversight and Government Reform.

Jurisdiction
[The subcommittee] shall have legislative and oversight jurisdiction over: the federal civil service; whistleblower protections; the U.S. Postal Service; government management and accounting measures; the economy, efficiency, and management of government operations and activities; government reorganization; intergovernmental affairs, including with state and local governments; federal information technology security, acquisition policy, and management; and federal property.

Members, 117th Congress

Historical subcommittee rosters

115th Congress

116th Congress

References

External links
Subcommittee Homepage

Oversight Government operations
Government procurement in the United States